St Matthew's, or St Matthew-in-the-City, is a historic Anglican church located in the Central Business District of Auckland, renowned for its neo-Gothic style since its completion in 1905.

History

As the city expanded, residential and commercial buildings sprung up to the west of Queen Street. To serve the Anglicans amongst the growing population, George Selwyn, New Zealand's first Anglican bishop, acquired land from the Crown in 1843 at the corner of Hobson and Wellesley Street. On it a one-room school was built from which Selwyn first conducted services.

In 1855 Selwyn appointed the designer of Old St Paul's, Wellington, the Reverend Frederick Thatcher as vicar of the new parish of St Matthew's. On 13 July, 30 people met in the school room to constitute the new parish.

Eastern Auckland remained the establishment part of the city. Meanwhile, St Matthew's in the west became the church of merchants and shopkeepers. Its finances reflected their support and acumen. From a shaky start – the Rev'd Thatcher's annual stipend was supplemented by 88 pounds from his military and prison chaplaincies – the parish became self-supporting within 10 years. By 1868 its income was 1000 pounds a year, then the largest in the diocese.

As Auckland grew to the west, so new parishes were established and St Matthew's built a mission chapel, St Thomas', in Freemans Bay in 1876.

In 1896 the parish decided it was time to build the stone church.  John Loughborough Pearson, designer of both Truro Cathedral in Cornwall and St John's Cathedral in Brisbane, Australia was engaged, but before he could complete the plans he died in December 1897. His son, Frank Loughborough Pearson, completed his work and the cornerstone was laid on 23 April 1902 by Governor Lord Ranfurly.

As central Auckland became increasingly commercial the population in the parish declined.  St Matthew's took on more of a role as church to the commercial and civic life of the city, a role it continues today. The church's size, location, style and musical tradition have made it a natural place for civic services to be held. Typical were a memorial service for Prime Minister Richard Seddon and for the silver jubilee of King George V in 1935. In two world wars, St Matthew's held services to farewell troops and to offer thanksgiving for their return. In recent years, St Matthew's has held civic memorial services for the victims of AIDS and the Air New Zealand Flight 901 disaster on Mount Erebus.

Because its location frequently brought it into contact with the poor, even in its early days, St Matthew's developed a strong social justice ministry. A leader in the protests against apartheid in South Africa during the 1981 Springbok Tour and sponsorship in 1974 of the Auckland Community Church, a congregation ministering to gays and lesbians established it as a strong voice for human rights. In 1996 Nelson Mandela recognised that voice by coming to St Matthew's to thank New Zealand for its important role in ending apartheid. Today St Matthew-in-the-City remains committed to serving the socially marginalised and promoting the UN Millennium Development Goals to eliminate extreme poverty.

The church has a pro-gay marriage stance and, after New Zealand legalised gay marriage, put out the call for gay couples to be married there.

The Revd Glynn Cardy, a former archdeacon and last vicar, resigned on 5 October 2013, and is now the Minister of a Presbyterian Church. The Revd Helen Jacobi was inducted, the first woman vicar of St Matthew's.

The building includes a 1300-year-old stone from the ruins of St Augustine's Abbey, England, and is listed as a Category I Historic Place. It has a peal of 8 bells, most of which were made in 1862, rung in the change ringing style by members of The Australian and New Zealand Association of Bellringers.

In December 2009 a billboard put up by the church showing Mary and Joseph in bed together drew global media attention as well as criticism from other churches.

References

 A Place on the Edge: the story of St Matthew-in-the-City - Leigh, Jack; Random House New Zealand, 2005

External links
St Matthew-in-the-City (official church website)
St Matthew's Chamber Orchestra (official orchestra website)
The World Cafe (official organization website)

Heritage New Zealand Category 1 historic places in the Auckland Region
Matthew
Anglican churches in New Zealand
Listed churches in New Zealand
1900s architecture in New Zealand
Auckland CBD